Nymphicula susannae is a moth in the family Crambidae. It was described by David John Lawrence Agassiz in 2014. It is found in Papua New Guinea.

The wingspan is about 13 mm. The base of the forewings is fuscous with a whitish antemedian fascia, suffused with yellow and edged with fuscous. The middle area of the costa is yellow mixed with fuscous and the median area is scaled with dark fuscous. The base of the hindwings is white mixed with fuscous.

Etymology
The species is named for the daughter of the author.

References

Nymphicula
Moths described in 2014